Bishop Moore Vidyapith Mavelikkara (BMVM) is a LKG–12 private, Christian, co-educational school in Kallumala, Mavelikkara, Kerala, India. It was established in 1975 and is named after Edward Alfred Livingstone Moore. It is part of the Diocese of Madhya Kerala of the Church of South India and is affiliated to the Council for the Indian School Certificate Examinations.

References

External links 
 

Church of South India schools
Private schools in Kerala
Christian schools in Kerala
Primary schools in Kerala
High schools and secondary schools in Kerala
Schools in Alappuzha district
Educational institutions established in 1975
1975 establishments in Kerala